Harry McGregor was a Scottish professional footballer who played as a goalkeeper. After a brief stint with Dundee in 1924, McGregor was playing for East Stirlingshire before signing for Dundee United after showing up well in a public trial in August 1928. He made his debut at the beginning of September 1928, displacing Jock McHugh between the posts. He became the first choice keeper for the rest of the season and helped the side to promotion, winning the Scottish Second Division championship. During the First Division campaign that followed, McGregor became the understudy to McHugh until the end of the season and was released in April 1930, joining Alloa Athletic. McGregor died in the early 1960s.

Honours

Dundee United
Scottish Second Division: 1
 1928–29

References

Scottish footballers
East Stirlingshire F.C. players
Dundee United F.C. players
Alloa Athletic F.C. players
Scottish Football League players
Association football goalkeepers
Year of birth missing
Place of birth missing
Place of death missing
1960s deaths
Year of death uncertain
Dundee F.C. players